France competed at the 2015 World Aquatics Championships in Kazan, Russia, from 24 July to 9 August 2015.

Medalists

Diving

French divers qualified for the individual spots and the synchronized teams at the World Championships.

Men

Women

Mixed

High diving

France has qualified one high diver at the World Championships.

Open water swimming

France fielded a full team of five swimmers to compete in the open water marathon.

Swimming

French swimmers have achieved qualifying standards in the following events (up to a maximum of 2 swimmers in each event at the A-standard entry time, and 1 at the B-standard): Swimmers must qualify at the 2015 French Championships in Limoges (for pool events) to confirm their places for the Worlds.

The French team consists of 28 swimmers (14 men and 14 women). Among the official roster featured defending World champion Camille Lacourt in the 50 m backstroke and 2012 Olympic champion Florent Manaudou in the 50 m freestyle. Reigning Olympic and World gold medalist Yannick Agnel was initially selected to the team, but had elected to withdraw from the Championships due to health issues, missing out an opportunity to successfully defend his 200 m freestyle title.

Men

Women

Mixed

Synchronized swimming

France fielded a full team of eleven synchronized swimmers to compete in each of the following events.

Women

Mixed

Water polo

Women's tournament

Team roster

Lorène Derenty
Estelle Millot
Léa Bachelier
Aurore Sacré
Louise Guillet
Géraldine Mahieu
Marie Barbieux
Marion Tardy
Lucie Cesca
Sonia Bouloukbachi
Yaëlle Deschampt
Michaela Jaskova
Morgane Chabrier

Group play

13th–16th place semifinals

13th place game

References

External links
 

Nations at the 2015 World Aquatics Championships
2015 in French sport
France at the World Aquatics Championships